The 2015 All-Ireland Minor Hurling Championship was the 85th staging of the All-Ireland hurling championship for players under the age of eighteen since its establishment by the Gaelic Athletic Association in 1928. The championship began on 8 April 2014 and ended on 6 September 2014.

Kilkenny were the defending champions.

Galway won the title after a 4–13 to 1–16 win against Tipperary in the final on 6 September.	

Kilkenny's Andrew Gaffney was the championship's top scorer with 1-38.

Results

Leinster Minor Hurling Championship

First round

Second round

Quarter-finals

Semi-finals

Final

Munster Minor Hurling Championship

Quarter-finals

Playoff

Semi-finals

Final

Ulster Minor Hurling Championship

Quarter-final

Semi-finals

Final

All-Ireland Minor Hurling Championship

Quarter-finals

Semi-finals

Final

Championship statistics

Scoring
First goal of the championship: Séamus Flanagan for Limerick against Cork (Munster quarter-final, 8 April 2015)

Top scorers

Overall

Single game

External links
 2015 Leinster Minor Hurling Championship fixtures
 2015 Munster Minor Hurling Championship fixtures
 2015 Ulster Minor Hurling Championship fixtures

References

Minor
All-Ireland Minor Hurling Championship